is a style of ikebana that is inspired by traditional Chinese landscapes. It developed from the Bunjinga (文人画 "literati painting") movement among different Japanese artists of the late Edo period, who however all shared an admiration for traditional Chinese culture and paintings. The style is also known as bunjinka.

Morimono (盛り物) is counted as a sub-form of bunjinbana by some school.

See also
 Moribana
 Senchadō

References

External links 

Ikebana